Fox sedge is a common name for several plants and may refer to:

Carex vulpina, native to Europe and western Asia
Carex vulpinoidea, native to North America and naturalized in Europe and New Zealand